is a railway station operated by JR Kyushu in Hita, Ōita Prefecture, Japan. It is the junction between the Kyudai Main Line and the Hitahikosan Line.

Lines

Layout 
The station consists of a side platform and an island platform serving three tracks on a side hill cutting. The station building is a modern structure but built in traditional Japanese style with a tiled roof, tiled entrance portico and verandah at the side. It is unstaffed and serves only as a waiting room. A flight of steps leads up the side hill cutting to the station building from the access road (National Route 386). Access to the island platform is by means of a footbridge.

Adjacent stations

History
In a further phase of expansion, the track was extended east with Yoake opening as the eastern terminus on 12 March 1932. On 1 April 1960, this track was linked to tracks further north and became part of the Hitahikosan Line. With the privatization of Japanese National Railways (JNR), the successor of JGR, on 1 April 1987, JR Kyushu took over control of the station.

Train services along this sector were cancelled. JR Kyushu has not announced a date for the resumption of service apart from stating that the suspension will be for an indefinite period.

Passenger statistics
In fiscal 2015, there were a total of 13,265 boarding passengers, giving a daily average of 36 passengers.

See also
 List of railway stations in Japan

References

External links
Yoake (JR Kyushu)

Railway stations in Ōita Prefecture
Railway stations in Japan opened in 1932